Unrestricted is a studio album by German power metal band, Symphorce, released on October 15, 2010, through AFM Records.

Track listing

Reception

Personnel 
Markus Pohl - Guitar
Steffen Theurer - Drums
Cedric "Cede" Dupont - Guitar
Dennis Wohlbold - Bass
Andy B. Franck - Vocals

References 

2010 albums